Obscure Destinies is a collection of three short stories by Willa Cather, published in 1932. Each story deals with the death of a central character and asks how the ordinary lives of these characters can be valued and how "beauty was found or created in seemingly ordinary circumstances".

Contents 
This collection contains the following stories:
 "Neighbour Rosicky"
 "Old Mrs. Harris"
 "Two Friends"

References

1932 short story collections
Short story collections by Willa Cather
Alfred A. Knopf books